Gillham Lake is a small reservoir located along the Cossatot River, mostly in Howard County, but also extending westward into Polk County, Arkansas.

Recreation
The Flood Control Act of 1958 approved the lake for construction. The lake provides flood control, water supply and wildlife conservation. Recreation was not planned for the lake purposes but they were included anyway. Gillham has five recreation areas, five boat ramps, three campgrounds, one picnic shelter, and one designated swim area. Gillham Lake includes  of fishing; bass is mostly caught in the lake. Canoeing and fly fishing on the Cossatot River are popular. The Cossatot River has been noted as the best canoeing area between the Rocky Mountains and the Great Smoky Mountains. There are two designated picnicking areas and one picnicking shelter that are chiefly used for reunions and family recreation. Gillham Lake also has the Coon Creek Walking Trail which is located on the entry road to Big Coon Creek Park.

Construction
Work on Gillham Dam began in June 1963, roads had to be relocated following the construction of the dam. The first concrete in the spillway was poured in November 1968. Work was halted in February 1971 but resumed in August 1972. The dam began storing water May 8, 1975.

See also 
List of Arkansas dams and reservoirs

External links
U. S. Army Corps of Engineers: Gillham Lake
U.S. Army Corps of Engineers: Corps Lake Gateway – Cossatot Lake

Reservoirs in Arkansas
Protected areas of Howard County, Arkansas
Protected areas of Polk County, Arkansas
Buildings and structures in Howard County, Arkansas
Buildings and structures in Polk County, Arkansas
Bodies of water of Howard County, Arkansas
Bodies of water of Polk County, Arkansas
1975 establishments in Arkansas